Climate change in Nigeria is evident from temperature increase, rainfall variability (increasing rainfall in coastal areas and decline in rainfall in the continental areas). It also reflects in drought, desertification, rising sea levels, erosions, floods, thunderstorms, burning of fossil fuels, bush fires, landslides, and loss of biodiversity.  All of these will continue to negatively affect human life and the ecosystems in Nigeria. Although depending on the location, regions experience climate change with significant higher temperatures during the dry seasons while rainfalls during rainy seasons help keep the temperature at milder levels.

There are few comprehensive reports  that provide useful evidence of  various impacts of climate change  experienced in Nigeria today.  The vast majority of the literature provides evidence of climate change holistically.  However, more  focus should target  the agricultural sector especially the subsistence practices in diverse regions where  large farming is dominant.  More  deliberations should concentrate on other mitigation and adaptation measures in  literature  which often takes the form of recommendations, rather than examples of what has already been achieved.

This topical discourse is likely due to the need for much greater implementation of mitigation and adaption measures in ensuring  Nigeria produce more food all through the year round to feed the growing population. In addition, while there is some discussion about necessary capacity building at the individual, group and community level to engage in climate change responses, there is also more or less attention given to higher levels of capacity building at the state and national level.

The associated challenges of climate change is not the same across all geographical locations in  the country. This is  because of the two precipitation regimes: high precipitation in parts of the Southeast and Southwest and low precipitation in the North dominates this relevant national issue. These regimes can result in aridity, desertification and drought in the north; erosion and flooding in the South and other regions.

Greenhouse gas emissions 
In 2018, Nigeria’s total greenhouse gas emissions was 336 million metric tons of carbon dioxide equivalent (MtCO2e), which is less than 1 percent of global emissions. This means that emissions per person per year is less than 2 tons, compared to the global average of over 6 tons. These greenhouse gases, mainly carbon dioxide and methane are mostly generated from oil and gas production, land-use change, forestry, agriculture and fugitive emissions. The economy is very dependent on oil production, so it may be hard to reach the target of net zero emissions by 2060.

Impacts on the natural environment

Temperature and weather changes

Current climate 

There are evidences that point to extreme weather events and changes in the climate system of Nigeria. Between 2014-2018, rising high temperatures above 40 °C had been observed in some central and northern parts of the country with Maiduguri and Nguru recording 44.5 °C and 44.4 °C respectively. This two locations were  identified to have recorded the highest number of days with day time temperature of above 40 °C (>70 days). There was also a case of heat wave in Lagos described as one of the most severe heat-waves in 2016.

Similarly, fewer cities recorded extreme night-time low temperatures that were equal or less than 10 °C. Lowest (night time) temperatures of 6.9 °C, 7.8 °C, and 8.3 °C were recorded in the northern states of Bauchi, Kano and Jos respectively. Usi-Ekiti (Ekiti North)  in the West and Jos in the North recorded highest number of days with prolonged low night time temperatures.

Within the same period, highest one-day rainfall value of 223.5mm was recorded in Abakiliki in the southeast which caused flooding that evacuated 5,000 residents. Flood and windstorm displaced no fewer than 7,290 people, killed 67 persons, destroyed above 3,900 homes and many farms in five northern states namely Sokoto, Kano, Kastina, Kebbi and Zamfara. Properties worth over 700million Naira were also destroyed. The Federal Government disbursed a total sum of 3 billion Naira from the Ecological fund within this period.

Nigeria has a tropical climate with two seasons: (wet and dry). Inland areas especially those in the northeast, experience the greatest fluctuations in temperatures as before the onset of rains, temperatures sometimes rise as high as 44 °C and drops to 6 °C between December to February. In Maiduguri, the maximum temperature may rise to 38 °C in April and May while in the same season frosts might occur at night.

For example in Lagos, the average high is 31 °C and low is 23 °C in January and 28 °C and 23 °C in June. The southeast regions especially located around the coast like Bonny (south of Port Harcourt), east of Calabar receive the highest amount of annual rainfalls of around 4,000 millimeters.

Changes in climate 

Climate change in Nigeria is shifting climate regions. The step region in the North is set to expand southwards, and tropical monsoon regions in the South are moving northwards, replacing tropical rainforest.

Nigeria Meteorological Agency (NiMet) in its 2019 seasonal rainfall prediction, predicted that 2019 will be another hot year. The mean annual variability and trend of rainfall over Nigeria in the last six decades depicts several inter-annual fluctuations and responsible for extreme climate events such as droughts and floods in many parts of the country.

Ecosystems 
Years ago, Nigeria experienced climate change disaster which happened in the Northeastern region which is now Borno and Yobe states the territory along the Southern part of lake Chad dried up. Due to logging and over dependence on firewood for cooking, a greater part of the Nigeria’s Guinea Savannah region has been stripped of its vegetation cover. Similarly, the forest around Oyo has been reduced to grassland. The lack of sufficient  cover trees and other vegetation can cause natural change, desertification, and soil breaking down, flooding, and extended ozone exhausting substances in the environment.

Sea level rise and floods 
In late August 2012, Nigeria was hit by the worst flooding ever experienced in 40 years. This affected 7 million people in communities across 33 states including kogi state. More than 2 million people out of the affected 7 million were driven from their homes by rising waters.

Nigeria experienced another flooding caused by heavy seasonal rains in 2013 which brought further misery to a population that was still recovering from the 2012 fatal floods. Many mud-brick homes collapsed and families' belongings were ruined. Dug wells which are sources of potable water were also polluted. The states of Abia, Bauchi, Benue, Jigawa, Kebbi, Kano, Kogi and Zamfara were most affected by the floodwaters which lasted for 48 hours. The situation in Kaduna and Katsina was aggravated by the collapse of earth dams. According to the National Emergency Management Agency, more than 47,000 people were affected. This lesser number of people affected is attributed to the lessons of the 2012 floods which prepared the country for a better response.

In Nigeria areas around the coastal regions are at risk of rising sea level. For example, the Niger Delta area is extremely vulnerable to flooding at a risk of rising sea level and a victim of extreme oil pollution. Climate change was the reason behind the flood that took place in Southern Nigeria in 2012. The flood was responsible for the loss of houses, farms, farm produce, properties and lives. According to statistics released in 2014 by National Emergency Management Agency (NEMA), about 5,000 houses and 60 homes were affected in a windstorm that occurred in four states in the south west region.

Impacts on people 
The country is likely to experience exacerbate floods, droughts, heat waves and hamper agricultural production in hotter and drier seasons.

Economic impacts

Agriculture 

Agriculture remains the mainstay of the Nigerian economy in spite of oil as it employs two-thirds of the entire working population. The sector is fraught with challenges as agricultural production is still mainly rainfed and subject to weather vagaries. Farmers find it hard to plan their operations due to unpredictable rainfall vagaries. Increase in the total amount of rainfall and extreme temperature would have more of a negative effect on staple crops productivity. However in northern states such as Borno, Yobe, Kaduna, Kano and Sokoto most crops might benefit economically. Crops such as millet, melon, sugarcane that are grown in the north will most likely benefit from extreme temperature.

The sector is also plagued with outdated land tenure system that limits access to land (1.8 ha/farming household), reduced irrigation development capacity (cropped land under irrigation less than 1 percent), limited access to credits, low adoption of technologies, expensive farm inputs, limited access to fertilizers, inadequate storage facilities and limited market access. All of these combined, have reduced agricultural productivity (average of 1.2 metric tons of cereals/ha) coupled with high postharvest losses and waste.

Fisheries 
The fisheries sub-sector in Nigeria contributes about 3–4 percent to the country’s annual GDP. It is also a key contributor to the nutritional requirements of the population as it constitutes about 50 percent of animal protein intake. The sub-sector also provides income and employment for a substantial number of small traders and artisanal fishermen. Over the past few years, capture fisheries have been declining and despite high potential Nigeria has in both fresh water and marine fisheries, domestic fish production still falls short of total demand. This has led to a high dependence on imports to reduce importation dependence, aquaculture has been made one of the priority value chains targeted for development by the Nigerian government. Climate change affects the characteristics and nature of freshwater resources due to rising sea levels and extreme weather events. Increased salinity and shrinking lakes and rivers are also threats to the viability of inland fisheries.

Forestry 
Nigeria is endowed with forest resources of diverse species. The excessive exploitation of these forest resources is a source of concern as it is a threat to the economic, environmental and social wellbeing of Nigerians. Apart from providing a significant proportion of global timber and fuel, with associated environmental functions. These includes wild animals, medicinal plants and herbs, watershed protection, hydrological regime stabilization and carbon sequestration. Forests regulate global climate and serves as a major agent of carbon exchange in the atmosphere. In Nigeria, natural forests have reduced drastically and its impacts on climate change are increasing. Erosion and excessive wind reduces the amount of forestry produce, such as wood and cane. Forests are under significant pressure not only from climate change but also from increasing populations and greater demand for forest resources.

Health impacts
NIMET has predicted an increased incidence of malaria due to climate change, and other diseases that will be higher in areas with temperatures ranging between 18–32 °C and with relative humidity above 60%.

Mitigation 
To mitigate the adverse effect of climate change, not only did Nigeria sign the Paris agreement to reduce emission, in its national climate pledge, the Nigerian government has promised to "work towards" ending gas flaring by 2030. In order to achieve this goal, the government established a Gas Flare Commercialisation Programme to encourage investment in practices that reduce gas flaring. Also, the federal government has approved a new National Forest Policy which is aimed at "protecting ecosystems" while enhancing social development. Effort is also been made to stimulate the adoption of climate-smart agriculture and the planting of trees.

Adaptation
Due to the negative impacts of climate change in Nigeria, a number of adaptive measures have been derived to minimise the impact. Adaptive measures and strategies such as:

 diversification and extension of protected areas for the conservation of ecosystems that are most vulnerable to climate change and sea level rise;
 maintaining ecological structure and processes at all levels and reducing existing pressure on natural ecosystems;
 reducing population and ecosystem vulnerability to climate change and reorientation of their evolution towards higher resistance to the changes;
 incorporating biodiversity conservation into adaptation strategies in the other sectors of the Nigerian economy;
 establishment and maintenance of protected area (in situ preservation), and the active management of wild populations outside of protected areas (ex situ management);
 development and implementation of programmes for restricted areas and buffer zones, resource harvesting on a sustainable basis, ecological restoration, sustainable management and agro ecosystems;
 monitoring to evaluate species and ecosystems stability from climate change perspective.

The Great Green Wall

As a means to prevent desertification, the Great Green Wall of the Sahara and the Sahel initiative is a planned project to plant a wall of trees across Africa at the southern edge of the Sahara desert. It is to be implemented in Nigeria in eleven front line states of Adamawa, Bauchi, Gombe, Kebbi, Sokoto, Zamfara, Katsina, Kano, Jigawa, Yobe and Borno. It will cover 43 local government areas of Nigeria in the frontline states to be covered to rehabilitate 225,000 ha of lands.

Nigeria Energy Transition Plan 
In 2021 during COP 26, the Nigerian President, His Excellency, President Muhammadu Buhari, unveiled the Nigerian Energy Transition Plan as part of country`s commitment towards achieving NET Zero by the year 2060. The Plan included a timeline and framework for achieving reduced emissions in certain sector of the country such as Oil and Gas, Cooking, Transport and Industry and Power. This is in a bid to help slow down the change in climate.

Policies and legislation 

Nigeria ratified the Paris Agreement, an international deal aimed at tackling climate change, in 2017 and has pledged to reduce its greenhouse gas emissions by 20% by 2030 with the condition of 45% of international support.

The country’s Nationally Determined Contributions (NDCs) was first submitted in 2017. The NDCs, made under the Paris Agreement embodies the country’s efforts to reduce national emissions and to adapt to the effects of climate change.  At the UNGA at Climate Change Summit, President Muhammadu Buhari laid out a plan for tackling climate change. A plan that would foster a low-carbon, high growth economic development path and also build a climate resilient Nigeria. The president’s seven-point plan reflects commitment and actions towards the Paris Agreement goals.

International cooperation
The UNDP is committed to supporting Nigeria and a UNDP-NDC Support Programme is already fully in motion. One of their goals is having increased engagement with the government and private sector.

Society and culture

Public perception 

A study of students at University of Jos, found that 59.7 of respondents had good knowledge about climate change, and understood it's connection to issues like Fossil fuel, Pollution, Deforestation and urbanization.

Less educated communities and communities in rural areas have not regularly demonstrated climate change knowledge. A survey of 1000 people in rural communities in southwestern Nigeria found that many members of the rural communities had superstitions about climate change, and that respondents had poor knowledge about the causes and effects.

See also 

 Geography of Nigeria
 Sustainable Development Goals and Nigeria
 Agriculture in Nigeria

References

External links 

 Climate change in Nigeria - Federal Ministry of Information and Culture

Environment of Nigeria
Nigeria
Nigeria
Climate of Nigeria
Effects of climate change
Climate change and the environment